Nambiyur is a Panchayat town and Panchayat Union in Nambiyur Taluk, Erode district, Tamil Nadu, in India.

"Nambiyur" is one of the new taluks in Erode district;Currently, Taluk office is present near Indian Oil petrol Bunk, in Nambiyur.

The Nambiyur was ruled by a small and proud king named "Nambi"; after his death, the people and the king's family named the town Nambiyur.

Banks  =bank of Baroda
State bank of india
Karur vishya bank
Indian overseas bank
Fedarel bank
City union bank are located in nambiyur

Petrol bunks like indian oil,hp,bharat petroleum

Geography
It has an average elevation of 301 metres (987 feet).

Demographics
As of 2011 India census, for Nambiyur Statistics Nambiyur had a population of 16,379. Males constitute 49.6% of the population and females 51.4%. Nambiyur has an average literacy rate of 65% (58% in 2001); male literacy is 73% (67% in 2001), and female literacy is 58% (50% in 2001). In Nambiyur, 9% of the population is in the age group 0–6 years.

References

Cities and towns in Erode district